This is a list of Danish television related events from 1961.

Events
19 February - Dario Campeotto is selected to represent Denmark at the 1961 Eurovision Song Contest with his song "Angelique". He is selected to be the fifth Danish Eurovision entry during Dansk Melodi Grand Prix held at the Frederecia Teater in Fredericia.

Debuts

Television shows

Ending this year

Births
26 September - Charlotte Fich, actress
8 December - Line Baun Danielsen, ice hockey player, journalist & TV host

Deaths

See also
 1961 in Denmark